The 1994 Marshall Thundering Herd football team represented Marshall University as a member of the Southern Conference (SoCon) during the 1994 NCAA Division I-AA football season. Led by fifth-year head coach Jim Donnan, the Thundering Herd compiled an overall record of 12–2 with a mark of 7–1 in conference play, winning the SoCon title. Marshall advanced to the NCAA  Division I-AA Championship playoffs for the fourth straight season, where they defeated Middle Tennessee in the first round and James Madison in the quarterfinals, before losing to Boise State in the semifinals. Marshall played home games at Marshall University Stadium in Huntington, West Virginia.

Regular season
Marshall went undefeated at home during the regular season and lost one game on the road to Appalachian State. Marshall's 7–1 conference record earned them the Southern Conference championship.

Postseason
By winning the Southern Conference championship, Marshall was awarded a bid in the 1994 NCAA Division I-AA playoffs. Marshall defeated Middle Tennessee State and James Madison in Huntington before falling to Boise State in Boise in the semifinal game.

During the James Madison playoff game Marshall cornerback Melvin Cunningham set a 1-AA playoff record with a 100-yard interception return for a touchdown.

Schedule

Roster

Awards and honors
 William Pannell, 1st Team All-Southern Conference 
 Travis Colquitt. 1st Team All-Southern Conference
 Shannon Morrison, 1st Team All-Southern Conference
 Billy Lyon, 1st Team All-Southern Conference
 Jamie Wilson, 2nd Team All-Southern Conference
 David Merrick, 2nd Team All-Southern Conference

References

Marshall
Marshall Thundering Herd football seasons
Southern Conference football champion seasons
Marshall Thundering Herd football